The 1990 Intercontinental Cup was an association football match played on 9 December 1990 between Milan of Italy, winners of the 1989–90 European Cup, and Olimpia of Paraguay, winners of the 1990 Copa Libertadores. The match was played at the neutral venue of the National Stadium in Tokyo in front of 60,228 fans. Frank Rijkaard was named as man of the match.

Match details

|valign="top" width="50%"|

|}
Assistant referees:
Chen Shengcai (China)
Shizuo Takada (Japan)

See also
1989–90 European Cup
1990 Copa Libertadores
A.C. Milan in European football

References

External links
FIFA Article

Intercontinental Cup
Intercontinental Cup
Intercontinental Cup
Intercontinental Cup
Intercontinental Cup
Intercontinental Cup (football)
Intercontinental Cup 1990
Intercontinental Cup 1990
Intercontinental Cup (football) matches hosted by Japan
Sports competitions in Tokyo
December 1990 sports events in Asia
1990 in Tokyo
1990 in association football